Tokyo tanks were internally mounted self-sealing fuel tanks used in the Boeing B-17 Flying Fortress and Consolidated B-24 Liberator bombers during World War II. Although nicknamed "Tokyo" tanks to dramatically illustrate the significant range they added to the B-17 (approximately 40% greater with combat weights), it was also an exaggeration in that no B-17 ever had the range to bomb Japan from any base in World War II.

Description 
These fuel tanks consisted of eighteen removable containers made of a rubberized compound, called cells, installed inside the wings of the airplane, nine to each side. The wings of the B-17 consisted of an "inboard wing" structure mounted to the fuselage which held the engines and flaps, and an "outboard wing" structure joined to the inboard wing and carrying the ailerons. The Tokyo tanks were installed on either side of the joint (a load-bearing point) where the two wing portions were connected. Five cells, totaling  capacity, sat side by side in the outboard wing and were joined by a fuel line to the main tank delivering fuel to the outboard engine. The sixth cell was located in the space where the wing sections joined, and the remaining three cells were located side-by-side in the inboard wing; these four cells delivered  of fuel to the feeder tank for the inboard engine. The same arrangement was repeated on the opposite wing.

All B-17F aircraft built by Boeing from Block 80, by Douglas from Block 25, and by Vega from Block 30 were equipped with Tokyo tanks, and the entire run of B-17Gs by all three manufacturers had Tokyo tanks. B-17s with factory-mounted Tokyo tanks were first introduced to the Eighth Air Force in England in April 1943 with the arrival of the 94th and 95th Bomb Groups, equipped with new aircraft. By June 1943, aircraft that were so equipped began to appear in greater numbers as replacements, and from the beginning of July 1943, all replacement aircraft that did not have the tanks already installed were equipped before issue.

Although the tanks were removable, this could only be done by first removing the wing panels, and so was not a routine maintenance task. A drawback to the tanks was that there was no means of measuring remaining fuel quantity within the cells. Fuel was moved from the cells to the engine tanks by opening control valves within the bomb bay so that the fuel drained by gravity. Although the tanks were specified as self-sealing, vapor buildup within partially drained tanks made them explosive hazards in combat.

References

Bishop, Cliff T. Fortresses of the Big Triangle First (1986), pp. 50–51. 

Aircraft fuel system components
Aerospace engineering
Fuel containers